The action off Lerwick ("Lerrick") was a naval engagement on 17 October 1917 fought in the North Sea during the First World War. The German light, minelaying cruisers  and  attacked a westbound convoy of twelve colliers and other merchant ships and their escorts, part of the regular Scandinavian convoy. The two escorting destroyers and nine neutral Scandinavian ships were sunk off Shetland, Scotland.

Both of the British destroyer commanders were commended for their bravery, though some members of the Admiralty felt that by leaving the convoy to engage a superior enemy force, they had left the merchant ships open to attack. Other British ships did not receive reports of the attack until late afternoon, were not in a position to intercept and the German cruisers returned safely to port. The British called the attack on neutral vessels, giving no time for the crews to abandon ship, an outrage.

The Germans denied allegations that their ships had fired on survivors in the water, despite the evidence of gunshot wounds to some crewmembers. Admiral David Beatty, the commander-in-chief of the Grand Fleet, severely criticised the Admiralty for failing to pass on information derived from the code-breakers of Room 40.

Background

Neutral shipping
The German U-boat campaign inflicted serious losses on neutral shipping but British counter-measures along the east coast of Britain and in the North Sea, including escorted convoys, managed to limit the losses of Scandinavian merchant ships. British losses continued unabated and in the last three months of 1916 losses of 618,000 gross register tons (GRT) were matched by only 220,000 GRT of new ships. From January to March 1917, 912,000 GRT were lost for a replacement of 326,000 GRT. Neutral shipping was an important addition to the British merchant fleet but in the last quarter of 1916, non-British shipping losses, excluding those of the Central Powers were 1, 159,000 GRT and in the next three months were 1,619,000 against new building of 587,000 GRT (mostly US construction). British ships were being fitted with defensive armament, often a 4.7-inch gun with a naval crew. Neutrals were afraid to arm their ships and compromise their status as non-combatants, making them more vulnerable than the British ships.

Norway

In February 1917, the British government took soundings with several neutral governments over the purchase of their merchant fleets but the suggestion was spurned. In negotiations with the Norwegian government about the resumption of coal imports from Britain, the Norwegians were so desperate for coal that they offered the merchant fleet if the matter could be carried off without German reprisals. The suggestion was all the more compelling to the Norwegians because the British could requisition their ships with no provision for any supplies to Norway. In June 1917, about 300,000 people protested against rising food prices, 40,000 in the capital, Kristiania. The Norwegian prime minister, Gunnar Knudson, thought that another coal shortage would cause mass unemployment, social unrest and possibly revolution. It was suggested that rather than sell the fleet, the Norwegians should charter it and that armed British ships be substituted on the routes suffering the worst losses from German U-boats. The Norwegian Shipowners' Association agreed to the Tonnage Agreement in which the transport of coal to Norway would be assured by British charter or requisition of the  ships. The British gained 130 freighters of 200,000 GRT and the Norwegians  of coal per month.

The Scandinavian convoy
In April 1917, the British began shipping coal north from the Humber Estuary to Lerwick in the Shetland Islands and then across the North Sea to Norway. The swept channel was extended northwards to Scotland and the Orkney Islands. The monthly quota of  required daily convoys from Lerwick, most being neutral Scandinavian ships, usually escorted by two British destroyers from a pool of eight detached from the Grand Fleet, supported by several armed trawlers. To 1 July, 351 ships made the eastbound journey from Lerwick and 385 the voyage westwards from Norway, an average of 368 round trips a month, for the loss of twenty ships. In anticipation of the added difficulty of escorting colliers in the autumn, winter and spring, several cruisers were sent to the Humber. The Scandinavian convoys had been a considerable success but had to sail in waters where they were vulnerable to German surface vessels for most of the journey. The return voyage began in Bergen in Norway, a neutral port where sailings could be observed by Germans and the use of neutral ships made it impossible for the British to keep convoy procedures and sailings secret.

Net mine barrage
Earlier in 1917, the Admiralty anticipated that U-boats would soon return to Germany. In early October 1917 another attack was planned. A barrage of underwater mine nets were to be laid at the narrow end of the funnel. At the wide (northern) end, four submarines mounted a standing patrol and further south, two destroyer leaders, fourteen destroyers and a yacht patrolled between the Moray Firth and the Firth of Forth. Net drifter fishing boats, were to place nets in the funnel between the Firth of Forth and Flamborough Head. Four destroyers and sixteen trawlers, commanded from the yacht, HMY Goissa. The southernmost end of the funnel, where U-boats had to skirt the Dogger Bank minefields, was to be patrolled by Harwich Force.

Storms interrupted the operation several times and the submarines, patrol ships and net barrage boats saw nothing of note during the operation. The net drifters reported nine underwater explosions as the nets were being strung out. The explosions were taken to be premature explosions of mines catching in the nets. As dark fell more explosions were heard, two green rockets were spotted at the east end of the net line and more explosions were heard. On 3 October, hydrophones detected a submarine at the west end of the nets, an explosion and then silence; other boats' hydrophone sets gave similar indications. There was silence until 9 October, when the destroyer  was attacked north of the net barrage. Before the U-boat was expected to reach the nets, another was seen and attacked, then a U-boat engine was heard clearly and a depth charge dropped. The weather had damaged the nets and mines and on 10 October the operation was terminated. The Director of Naval Intelligence reported a month later that three U-boats had been destroyed close to the mine trap; German sources later confirmed that ,  and  had been sunk.

Prelude

High Seas Fleet

During late 1917, the commander of the High Seas Fleet, Admiral Reinhard Scheer, decided to augment the U-boat campaign with attacks on the Scandinavian convoys by surface ships. Scheer hoped to terrorise Scandinavian neutrals, who were co-operating with the British and sailing in convoys with naval escorts. Scheer anticipated that success would force the British to divert naval ships from counter-U-boat operations and create an opportunity to engage the Grand Fleet at an advantage. U-boat reports gave the impression that much shipping was moving between Lerwick and Bergen in Norway. German bases to the south of the route made a surprise attack at the east end of the convoy route by surface ships feasible. The short days and stormy weather in the autumn and winter increased the possibility that a sortie could go unobserved.

By forcing the British to reinforce the escorts of the Scandinavian convoy, a surface ship attack could help the wider U-boat campaign. The minelaying gear was taken off and the ships disguised to look like British C-class cruisers. Brummer and Bremse kept wireless silence and Brummer had a wireless interception team on board to jam British signals.

Room 40

In this section, the course of British code breaking and communication between the Admiralty, Beatty and ships at sea has anticipated events for continuity. On 15 October, Room 40 decrypted a message from Brummer that "Most Secret Order 71950" had been put back to 16 October. The message contained notice that the ship would sail via Norman Deep, because Way Blue had been blocked by mines, asking that minesweeping be carried out. An hour later, Admiral Sir Henry Oliver, the Deputy Chief of the Naval Staff, dispatched a signal to Beatty, "Minelayer Brummer leaves via Norman Deep tomorrow 16 to northward probably for minelaying. She should be intercepted". More decodes became available to Oliver soon afterwards and should have suggested that minelaying might not be the reason for the sortie; wireless silence was unusually rigorous and a decoded message from the submarine UB-64 described much shipping off Lerwick. Late on 16 October, the light cruiser  reported that it would be off List auf Sylt at the north end of the island of Sylt with destroyer escorts, corresponding to a signal from Brummer that afternoon. Signals were then decrypted ordering all U-boats to refrain from attacks on light cruisers, except when certain that they were British. Oliver had undertaken to pass on new data to ships at sea but failed to supply this, the inferences that could be drawn from them or to contact Beatty until eighteen hours later, by when the convoy had been attacked.

15 October convoy

The destroyers were each armed with three 4-inch Mk IV (100 mm) guns, three 2-pounder pom-pom Mk II and two 21-inch (533 mm) torpedo tubes. Around noon on 16 October, Mary Rose left the convoy to join the next westbound convoy assembling at Bergen as Stongbow saw to the dispersal of the eastbound colliers to their destinations. Mary Rose departed from Bergen with the westbound convoy, comprising one Danish, five Norwegian, three Swedish, two British and a Belgian freighter, on the afternoon of 16 October. Mary Rose sailed beyond the convoy and after dark, when Strongbow made rendezvous, the destroyers were unable to communicate. Strongbow sailed on the port side of the convoy. There was a fresh [] breeze blowing from the south-west and a heavy swell in good visibility. The escorts had not been informed of the sailing of a German surface force, the steps taken to intercept them or that an alarm covering the North Sea had been in force for two days.

Grand Fleet

After the success of the mine trap at the beginning of October and the mines laid across the Heligoland Bight, U-boats had begun to use the Kattegat into the Baltic Sea for transit. German minesweepers were constantly busy clearing mines with battleships in support in case of British attacks. The British devised a plan to lay mines close to the German coast and river mouths to take advantage of the High Seas Fleet operating temporarily in the Baltic. While the arrangements were being made, four light cruisers, twelve destroyers and a destroyer leader were ordered to attack the German minesweepers operating in the German Bight. The Admiralty postponed the cruiser operation against German minesweepers and ordered all light cruisers and the twelve destroyers to prepare to sail to intercept a German surface force believed to be in the North Sea.

Ignorant that the Admiralty was failing to pass on information, Admiral David Beatty, the commander of the Grand Fleet, was constrained to scour the North Sea. Two more light cruiser squadrons, each with five or six destroyers, were sent to patrol lines in the central North Sea by noon on 16 October. After notice from the Admiralty that  would be reconnoitring on the same day, Beatty ordered , a battlecruiser which carried aircraft, to conduct a sweep eastwards from just north of Middlesbrough.

Action 

Lookouts on Strongbow spotted two unusual vessels converging on the destroyer; three challenges were signalled to the ships and the third challenge received an erroneous reply. Brooke called the ship to action stations. When the range was down to within  and before the crew could reach action stations, the German ships opened fire with their  guns. The first German salvoes at Strongbow cut the main steam-pipe; many members of the crew below decks were scalded to death; Brooke was wounded and the ship was left dead in the water, with its decks covered with casualties. Other hits knocked out the wireless before the signaller could raise the alarm. Mary Rose also sent a wireless signal as it closed with the German ships and another station asked for the signal to be repeated but Brummer jammed the signal. The German ships jammed every subsequent attempt by the British to transmit a distress call.

Brooke ensured that the codebooks and confidential papers had been jettisoned then ordered the ship to be scuttled; the survivors took to the water in a Carley float at about  The German cruisers inflicted more damage on Strongbow while Elise was manoeuvring to rescue the crew and the ship sank at about  Four of the merchantmen were sunk with gunfire; Fox heard the noise astern, assumed that a U-boat had attacked the convoy and turned towards it, with enough time to go to action stations, hampered by not being able to use the torpedoes and guns at the same time, because the range and deflection transmitters were not working. The German ships fired on the Carley float and a motor boat carrying survivors of Strongbow 

With Mary Rose sunk, the Germans returned their attention to the freighters; the Germans ignored Prize rules, firing at the merchant ships without giving time for the crews to abandon them. The Danish Margrethe had stopped engines as soon as the attack began but was fired on as boats were lowered; as the lifeboats were rowed away, astern of Margrethe, shells fell close by. With the ship on fire and the boilers exploding, Bremse and Brummer attacked the other ships, sinking five more. The wreck of Margrethe was sunk by Bremse and Brummer with broadsides from both beams as they left the area, making for home at  P. Fannon, the two British and the Belgian ships escaped; Elise returned when the coast was clear to rescue survivors, including 45 men from the crew of Strongbow. (The survivors from Mary Rose reached Norway and were tended by lighthouse keepers.) Attempts by the British ships to send wireless messages having failed, British naval forces in the area continued a search for a minelayer. The Admiralty thought that the German ships were still in port but postponed the Lerwick to Norway sailing due on 18 October, prompting Beatty to ask for clarification. Oliver sent a report at  suggesting that the ships were chasing convoys (Bremse and Brummer were north of Bergen, running south for Horns Reef).

Aftermath

Analysis

In 1983, Patrick Beesly wrote that the German attack had been well planned and efficiently carried out but that the Admiralty should have been more effective in its countermeasures. At  on 17 October, Oliver signalled to Beatty,

Beesly wrote that had Beatty received the signal during the evening of 16 October, rather than after an eighteen-hour delay, he would have probably issued different orders, with more chance to protect the convoy and sink the cruisers. Beesly called the failure to communicate inexcusable; contemporary records show that all decodes were sent by Room 40 to the Operations Division with, at most, a fifty-minute delay since interception. Room 40 was not allowed knowledge of the positions of British ships which, with the decrypts, would have shown the peril which the Scandinavian convoys faced. The Operations Division keep a plot and received the data from Room 40; Beesly called the failure to communicate another example of "Oliver's many inexplicable failures to make proper use of the priceless intelligence at his disposal".

In 1994, Paul Halpern wrote that the Admiralty was still overly secretive of its code-breaking activities and lack of liaison between departments led to failures of interpretation of information. Room 40 discovered from its call sign that Brummer had sailed and assumed that it was on a mine laying sortie but was kept in ignorance of British ship movements, information on which was reserved for the Operations Division. Had the code-breakers been privy to this information they might have inferred German intentions. Halpern also wrote that it was remiss of the Operations Division to not consider that the German ships were out to attack a convoy and to take so long to communicate with Beatty, who, with some asperity, laid blame on the Admiralty in the aftermath.

The German newspapers trumpeted the success,

a claim by the Swedish captain of SS Visbur was publicised that the British trawlers had rescued British sailors and abandoned the Scandinavian survivors. In Britain, the Daily Mail blamed the government and the Admiralty for the failure, much to the disdain of at least one of the officers on the Scandinavian convoy route who called the Mail a beastly paper in his diary. In 1969, Arthur Marder wrote that the fiasco was regarded as an outrage by the Allies, who protested that the attack on neutral ships was illegal and that the Germans gave the crews of the merchant vessels no time to evacuate, which caused so many civilian casualties. Both of the British destroyer commanders received credit for bravery, though some members of the Admiralty felt that by leaving the convoy to engage a superior enemy force, they had left the merchant steamers open to attack.

Courts of enquiry were held into the losses of Strongbow and Mary Rose; the inquiry into the loss of Strongbow found grounds for regret that the German ships were challenged three times before the captain called the crew to action stations. The findings of the hearing into the loss of Mary Rose concluded that while Fox and his crew fought bravely, by choosing to attack the German ships Fox left the convoy without protection when he could have held off and concentrated on transmitting sighting reports. Courts martial findings blamed Fox for not attacking with torpedoes but described his decisions as being "in the highest traditions of the service"; Brooke was blamed for not keeping at a distance but ruled that this was an error of judgement rather than a matter for disciplinary action.

In 2019, Steve Dunn wrote that the verdicts were unduly harsh, since after the war German records showed that Mary Rose sent a wireless message which received a reply before the German ships jammed subsequent signals. Dunn also wrote that defensive tactics were alien to the offensive culture of the Royal Navy. In his diary, the Cabinet Secretary Sir Maurice Hankey, wrote that, despite the Admiralty having been warned of a likely attack by a reliable source, it had bungled; Sir Eric Geddes blamed the First Sea Lord, Admiral John Jellicoe and wanted him replaced by Admiral Rosslyn Wemyss.

Casualties

Of the 98 crew of Mary Rose, 88 were killed, two officers and eight men surviving; the 86 crew of Strongbow suffered 47 killed. The Swedish H. Wikander suffered sixteen fatal casualties and the Norwegian Kristine ten of the eleven crewmen still on board while abandoning ship were killed; the mate was found in a boat dead of gunshot wounds with three wounded crewmembers. Captain Roeneviz, the master of Kristine was picked up by a lifeboat from Habil and said that after he ordered the crew to abandon ship, a shell hit the after lifeboat, killing seven men, at which the crew re-boarded Kristine and vainly signalled to the Germans to cease firing. Roeneviz told reporters later,

Thirty-six merchant sailors were killed and 119 survivors landed in Norway. The German ships were accused of shelling survivors in the water but the accusation was denied, despite evidence of gunshot wounds and the testimony of survivors.

Subsequent events

The Norwegian government sent a protest to the German Foreign Office against an infringement of freedom of the seas. The government claimed that German depredations were the reason for Norwegian ships joining convoys guarded by belligerents against Germany and called on Germany to order submarine commanders to refrain from endangering Norwegian sailors. At the Admiralty a conference was held on 22 October from which on 5 November Beatty and his staff made proposals to change the system of Scandinavian convoys. Convoys should sail from Methil Docks, on the north bank of the Firth of Forth, which was better equipped than Lerwick and closer to Swedish and Danish trade routes. The southward move would send convoys closer to German bases, against which the convoys should be integrated into the Atlantic convoy system, with cruiser protection. The next Scandinavian convoy sailed from Norway to Lerwick on 20 October. From 11 to 12 December the Germans undertook a more ambitious operation simultaneously to intercept a Scandinavian convoy and shipping on the route along the British east coast to Lerwick and back.

Orders of battle

Data taken from Marder (1969) unless indicated
 , minelaying light cruiser (flagship)
 , minelaying light cruiser

Royal Navy
Data taken from Newbolt (2003) unless indicated
 Mary Rose, destroyer (flagship)
 Strongbow, destroyer
 Elise, naval trawler
 P. Fannon, naval trawler

Convoy
Data taken from Dunn (2019) unless indicated
 British
 SS City of Cork
 SS Ben Cleugh
 Belgian
 SS Londonier
 Danish
 Margrethe: 1,243 Gross Register Tons (GRT), in ballast
 Norwegian
 Dagbjørg: 787 GRT, pit props
 Habil: 636 GRT, iron ore
 Silja: 1,231 GRT, pit props
 Sørhaug: 1,007 GRT, general merchandise
 Kristine: 568 GRT, wood pulp
 Swedish
 Visbur: 962 GRT, general merchandise
 H. Wicander: 1,256 GRT, cargo not known
 Stella; 836 GRT, iron ore, paper pulp

Notes

Footnotes

References

 
  Completed in 1921 as The Blockade of the Central Empires 1914–1921, published marked "Confidential" in 1937 with new title

Further reading

External links
 Londinier, Maritime Archaeology Trust 

North Sea operations of World War I
Naval battles of World War I involving the United Kingdom
Naval battles of World War I involving Germany
Conflicts in 1917
1917 in Scotland
Lerwick
History of Shetland
20th century in Shetland
Maritime incidents in Scotland
October 1917 events